Bombon, officially the Municipality of Bombon, is a 4th class municipality in the province of Camarines Sur, Philippines. According to the 2020 census, it has a population of 17,995 people.

History

Like any other municipalities in the province, the town of Bombon also started as a mere barrio or "visita". It was dependent on the town of the ancient Quipayo for nearly 240 years, now a mere barangay of Calabanga town. It finally gained its independence during the arrival of the Americans on February 11, 1900. This taste of freedom was, however, momentary for after the establishment of the Civil Government occurred in the Philippines in the year 1903, Bombon was ceded to the municipality of Calabanga .

The municipality of Bombon also became a barrio of Magarao, now another town in the second district. For more than forty years of waiting, it was finally given its proclamation as a town by virtue of Executive Order (EO) 251 dated July 27, 1949 signed by the then President Elpidio Quirino. Appointed officials are Jose Buenagua Sr, Mayor; Juan Nale, Casiano Aburro, Manuel Rojo, and Julian Sumangid, Councilors. Jose Buenagua Jr went on to be the Provincial Engineer of Albay. Jose Jr now resides in Scottsdale AZ. He had also two daughters, Irene Buenagua Fernandez and Lydia Buenagua Guerrero, both retired teachers, and three other sons, Salvador, Melchor, and Diogenes Buenagua who are all still residing in Bombon. The acquired independence continued permanently and it served well its constituents. Foundation Anniversary celebrated every August 13.

In 1993, by EO no. 102 of President Fidel V. Ramos, Bombon was included in the creation of the Metro Naga Development Council together with Bula, Calabanga, Camaligan, Canaman, Gainza, Magarao, Milaor, Minalabac, Ocampo, Pamplona, Pasacao, Pili, and San Fernando, all in the province of Camarines Sur.

"Bombon" was once an old name of Taal Lake in Batangas illustrated in a 1885 antique map. Batangas was first came to be known as Bombon also. 

The Leaning Bell Tower, dubbed as the country's own version of Italy 's Leaning Tower of Pisa, found in this municipality serves as a major historical attraction.

Geography

Barangays
Bombon is politically subdivided into 8 barangays.
 Pagao (San Juan)
 San Antonio
 San Francisco
 San Isidro (Poblacion)
 San Jose (Poblacion)
 San Roque (Poblacion)
 Santo Domingo
 Siembre

Climate

Demographics

Literacy Rate 
 97.75% in both rural as well as urban areas
 Almost half of the population 5 years and older have reached elementary grade and about 25.8% have finished high school

Work and Labor Force 
 15 years and older - about 3,590 or 55% are in the active labor force while the remaining 45% are schooling, disabled, or home caretaker
 Majority (3,590) of the population in the active force are gainfully employed with only 158 as unemployed
 Agriculture and its complementary industries are the major sources of employment

Languages 
 98% of the population considers Bikol as their first language
 Tagalog: 1.67%
 English language as second language

Religion 
 Approximately ninety five percent (95%) of the population is Roman Catholics
 5% subdivided into the different modern sects of religion such as the Iglesia ni Cristo, UCCP, Aglipay, Born Again, Jehovah's Witnesses, Seventh Day Adventist and other forms religious affiliation

Housing 
 71% of the total housing units are considered single dwelling and it is mostly made-up
of concrete and semi-permanent materials
 Shanties or "barong-barong" accounts to about 29% of the total number of housing units

Economy 
Despite staying as a 4th class municipality more developments are happening in town, this was made possible by the local government of The town, including the government of Camarines Sur. Being strategically located in 2 booming municipalities the town of Calabanga in the north and Naga City to the south the town itself is already a small growing municipality. It's proximity to Naga City is also one of the reasons why there are developments in Bombon.

Agricultural Sector 
 Major Crops:
 Active agricultural area: About 3,978.7580 hectares
 Mostly planted with rice either irrigated, rainfed or upland rice
 Irrigated paddy rice has an estimated area of about 1,028.75 hectares while rainfed and upland rice occupies about 564.87 and 33 hectares, respectively
 Corn areas comprise 38.75 hectares and sugarcane has 118.18 hectares
Livestock and Poultry Production
 As of 1999, area has an estimated animal population of about 6,374 heads
 3,740 or 59% are poultry and 2,634 or 41% are livestock
 Chicken has an aggregate number of 2,567 and ducks with 1,053 heads
 Major livestock raise is swine with 1,850 heads while carabao and sheep/goat have 176 and 203 heads, respectively

Public services

Health 
 Health facilities consist of the following:
1 Rural Health Unit
1 barangay station

Education 
● 7 Public Elementary School

- Bombon Central School

- San Roque Elementary School

- San Francisco Elementary School

- Sto. Domingo Elementary School

- Pagao Elementary School

- San Antonio Elementary School

- Siembre Elementary School

● 2  Public Secondary High School

- Sulpicio A. Roco Memorial High School (formerly San Jose Barangay High School)

- Siembre High School

Protection and Security 
 Current police ratio to the population is 1:1,363

References

External links

 [ Philippine Standard Geographic Code]
Philippine Census Information
Official Site of the Province of Camarines Sur
 

Municipalities of Camarines Sur
Metro Naga
Establishments by Philippine executive order